Ercheu is a commune in the Somme department in Hauts-de-France in northern France.

Etymology of the place name
Diverting from the Latin word " Arx-Arcis ", strengthened place:
  988 : Arceium 
 1048 : Archeium
 1150 : Erceium
 1170 : Erchive
 1237 : Herciaus
 1248 : Erchieu
 1633 : Erchu
 1705 : Archeu
 1764 : Ercheu
The name of the municipality is unchanged since 1764.

Geography
Although peak tunnel "Souterrain de Panneterie" of the Canal du Nord lies outside the neighbouring municipality, it is named after Ferme La Panneterie located in Ercheu.

The castle-like Ferme Lannoy was a monastery named Notre Dame ('Our Lady') in the 14th century.

History
There was once an Merovingian cemetery in Ercheu. Since 1120 there was also a leper colony.

In the First World War, the village was destroyed. The community received the Croix de guerre 1914-1918 as an award.

The former villages Bessancourt, Ramecourt, and Wailly-lès-Ercheu were abandoned.

Population

Administration
The current mayor is François Lamaire, in office since 2014 and re-elected in 2020. Ercheu is part of the communauté de communes du Grand Roye since January 1, 2012.

Gallery

See also
Communes of the Somme department

References

External links
 Official website 

Communes of Somme (department)